Gabriele Bertaccini (born 18 December 1985) is an Italian chef, television personality, and writer. He is known for his role as the food expert on the Netflix series Say I Do.

Life and career
Bertaccini was born and raised in Florence to a Mormon Italian family. He learned to cook at the age of 13, training at the Bernardo Buontalenti Institute of Culinary Arts and Management in regional Italian cuisine with a speciality in Tuscan cuisine as well as in food and beverage management. He then worked at several restaurants and hotels such as Ristorante Sabatini, Grand Hotel Baglioni, and Hotel Astoria and was named head chef at boutique restaurant Conquinarius.

He moved to the United States where he studied journalism and PR at Arizona State University. Bertaccini founded his first catering company, il TOCCO FOOD, in 2008. His second catering company, Culinary Mischief, is dedicated to invitation only experiences, and his third, the [UN]OFFICIAL, was founded in 2015. He was a food and wine columnist for the local Green Living Magazine.

In 2019, he became one of the hosts and the food expert on the Netflix reality series Say I Do.

Personal life
Bertaccini is based in Venice, Los Angeles with his four Australian Shepards. He is openly gay. In the first episode of Say I Do, he revealed he is HIV-positive.

References

External links
 Official website
 

Living people
1985 births
Arizona State University alumni
Gay entertainers
Italian chefs
Italian emigrants to the United States
Italian food writers
Italian television chefs
Italian television personalities
Italian gay men
Mass media people from Florence
People with HIV/AIDS